Vidalia Regional Airport  is a city-owned public-use airport located three nautical miles (6 km) southeast of the central business district of the city Vidalia, in Toombs County, Georgia, United States.

Facilities and aircraft 
It has two concrete paved runways: 7/25 measuring 6,003 by 100 feet (1,830 x 30 m) and 14/32 measuring 5,000 by 75 feet (1,524 x 46 m).

For the 12-month period ending April 2, 2007, the airport had 17,000 aircraft operations, an average of 46 per day: 94% general aviation and 6% military. At that time there were 21 aircraft based at this airport: 86% single-engine, 10% multi-engine and 5% helicopter.

History
The airfield was opened to the public on 12 August 1940. In May 1943, during World War II, the airport was requisitioned by the United States Army Air Forces, and was known as Vidalia-Lyons Army Airfield.   Also known as Turner AAF Auxiliary Airfield No. 8, the airfield supported the elementary & advanced training in two-engine aircraft being conducted at Turner AAF.

The airfield inactivated on 28 December 1944, and was declared surplus in 1946.

See also
 Georgia World War II Army Airfields

References

 Manning, Thomas A. (2005), History of Air Education and Training Command, 1942–2002.  Office of History and Research, Headquarters, AETC, Randolph AFB, Texas 
 Shaw, Frederick J. (2004), Locating Air Force Base Sites, History’s Legacy, Air Force History and Museums Program, United States Air Force, Washington DC. 
 Shettle, M. L. (2005), Georgia's Army Airfields of World War II.

External links
 

1940 establishments in Georgia (U.S. state)
Airfields of the United States Army Air Forces in Georgia (U.S. state)
Airports in Georgia (U.S. state)
Buildings and structures in Toombs County, Georgia
Transportation in Toombs County, Georgia
Airports established in 1940